Leslie Maurice Lever, Baron Lever, GCSG (29 April 1905 – 26 July 1977) was a British Labour politician. He was Member of Parliament for Manchester Ardwick from 1950 to 1970, when he retired. Subsequently, he was given a life peerage as Baron Lever, of Ardwick in the City of Manchester on 10 July 1975.

He was educated at Manchester Grammar School and read Law at Leeds University. He was a solicitor and poor man's lawyer between 1928 and the advent of Legal Aid in 1948, funding his impecunious clients' cases out of his own pocket if they lost. His younger sister and three younger brothers were all lawyers. His brother Harold was also a Member of Parliament.

He served as Lord Mayor of Manchester (1957–58), attending 2,700 official engagements. His political career both as a councillor and M.P., representing inner city slum areas.

He was knighted by Popes John XXIII and Paul VI,  as well as by the Queen in 1970 for his philanthropic work. He died in Manchester in 1977, aged 72.

Arms

References

 William D. Rubinstein, Michael Jolles & Hilary L. Rubinstein, The Palgrave Dictionary of Anglo-Jewish History (2011) pg. 638

External links 

1905 births
1977 deaths
Labour Party (UK) MPs for English constituencies
Labour Party (UK) life peers
UK MPs 1950–1951
UK MPs 1951–1955
UK MPs 1955–1959
UK MPs 1959–1964
UK MPs 1964–1966
UK MPs 1966–1970
UK MPs who were granted peerages
Knights Bachelor
Knights Grand Cross of the Order of St Gregory the Great 
Lord Mayors of Manchester
Alumni of the University of Leeds
People educated at Manchester Grammar School
English solicitors
English Jews
Jewish British politicians
Politicians awarded knighthoods
Life peers created by Elizabeth II